The palm cockatoo (Probosciger aterrimus), also known as the goliath cockatoo or great black cockatoo, is a large smoky-grey or black parrot of the cockatoo family native to New Guinea, Aru Islands, and Cape York Peninsula.  It has a very large black beak and prominent red cheek patches.

Taxonomy
The palm cockatoo was formally described in 1788 by the German naturalist Johann Friedrich Gmelin in his revised and expanded edition of Carl Linnaeus's Systema Naturae. He placed it with the parrots in the genus Psittacus and coined the binomial name Psittacus aterrimus. Gmelin based his description on the "black cockatoo" that had been described and illustrated in 1764 by the English naturalist George Edwards. Joan Gideon Loten had provided Edwards with a drawing of the bird by the Sri Lankan artist Pieter Cornelis de Bevere. The original drawing by de Bere is in the collection of the Natural History Museum, London. The palm cockatoo is now the only species placed in the genus Probosciger that was introduced by Heinrich Kuhl in 1820. The genus name combines the Latin proboscis meaning "snout" with -ger meaning "carrying". The specific epithet aterrimus is Modern Latin meaning "very black". The accepted type locality is the Aru Islands, rather than "northern Australia".

The palm cockatoo is a member of the white cockatoo subfamily Cacatuinae. Earlier limited genetic studies found it to be the earliest offshoot from the ancestors of what have become the cockatoo family. 

"Palm cockatoo" has been designated the official name by the International Ornithological Committee (IOC). The species was named the "Goliath Aratoo" in Wood's Natural History (1862). It is also sometimes given the misnomer "black macaw" in aviculture – the macaws are unrelated New World parrots. Confusingly, this name was also used by early naturalists and Brazilian natives to refer to the dark blue hyacinth macaw.

Four subspecies are recognized.
 P. a. stenolophus (van Oort, 1911) – Yapen (Geelvink Bay islands, northwest New Guinea) and north, east New Guinea
 P. a. goliath (Kuhl, 1820) – Raja Ampat Islands (northwest of New Guinea), Bird's Head Peninsula (northwest New Guinea) and west, central, southeast New Guinea
 P. a. aterrimus (Gmelin, JF, 1788) – Aru Islands (southwest of New Guinea)
 P. a. macgillivrayi (Mathews, 1912) – south New Guinea and north Cape York Peninsula, northeast Queensland (northeast Australia)

A 2007 genetic study found little support for the above division into subspecies.

Description
It may be the largest cockatoo species and largest parrot in Australia, although large races of yellow-tailed black cockatoos and sulphur-crested cockatoos broadly overlap in size. It is a distinctive bird with a large crest and has one of the largest bills of any parrot (only the hyacinth macaw's is larger). This powerful bill enables palm cockatoos not only to eat very hard nuts and seeds, but also enables males to break off thick (about 1 in) sticks from live trees to use for a drumming display. The male has a larger beak than the female. The beak is unusual, as the lower and upper mandibles do not meet for much of its length, allowing the tongue to hold a nut against the top mandible while the lower mandible works to open it. The palm cockatoo also has a distinctive red cheek patch that changes colour when the bird is alarmed or excited.

The  races P. a. goliath and P. a. stenolophus are larger than the nominate subspecies. The race stenolophus also has narrower crest feathers.

Vocalisation

The vocalizations of palm cockatoos are similar to those of most wild parrots, but they have also been shown to produce a variety of additional syllables in display and exchange with neighbouring individuals. These additional syllables are mainly produced by males and are often combined to form long, complex sequences. In a population in the Iron Range, 30 different syllables were distinguished. The palm cockatoos from the east have different call types from the ones from other areas, due to their long term isolation.

Distribution and habitat
The palm cockatoo is found in rainforests and woodlands of New Guinea and Cape York Peninsula, Queensland, Australia. It can still be found near Sorong, West Papua, Indonesia, where it is sometimes seen in trees along the roads.

Behaviour and ecology
It has a unique territorial display where the bird (typically the male) drums with a large (i.e. up to 2.5 cm diameter, 15 cm long) stick or seed pod against a dead bough or tree, creating a loud noise that can be heard up to 100 m away. After drumming, the male occasionally strips the drum tool into small pieces to line the nest. Although this drumming behaviour was discovered over three decades ago (in 1984 by G.A. Wood), the reason why palm cockatoos drum is still a mystery. One reason could be that females can assess the durability of the nesting hollow by the resonance of the drumming. Another possibility could be that males drum to mark their territory against other males. The palm cockatoo is an unusual bird, being an ancient species and one of the few bird species known to use tools.

Flocking
This species normally does not appear in large numbers. They are not known to flock feed like many of the cockatoo species. Usually only one to six individuals are observed feeding together at one time. As with other large birds, both parents care for young, so seeing a breeding pair is not unusual.  If these birds do congregate, it will usually happen in open woodland just after sunrise or along the rainforest edge before returning to individual roosts for the night.

Breeding
Palm cockatoos only lay one egg every second year and have one of the lowest breeding success rates reported for any species of parrot. Offsetting this is their very long lifespan. A male commenced breeding at 29 in Taronga Zoo in Sydney, and a female at the London Zoo was 40 when she laid her first egg in 1966.  Breeding takes place inside tree hollows that look like standing pipes. Fires play an important role in the destruction and creation of nest hollows. Fires allow the colonisation of microorganisms and termites, which enter the tree and start hollowing out the inside. Cyclones are important in the final stage of nest hollow development.

Anecdotal evidence indicates a palm cockatoo reaching 80 or 90 years of age in an Australian zoo, although the oldest confirmed individual was aged 56 in London Zoo in 2000. Although longevity of captive birds is known, the lifespan of palm cockatoos that live in the wild is still unknown .

Food and feeding

The palm cockatoo often feeds during the early hours of the day on a diet that consists mostly of wild growing pandanus palm fruit and nuts from the kanari tree. They have also been seen eating fruit from Darwin stringy bark Eucalyptus tetradonta and nonda tree, as well as seeds from the cocky apple tree, beach almond, and black bean tree.

Conservation and status

The palm cockatoo is still relatively common in Cape York, but is threatened there by habitat destruction, particularly due to bauxite mining around Weipa and altered fire regimens elsewhere. Palm cockatoos are hunted in New Guinea.  The palm cockatoo is currently evaluated as Least Concern on the IUCN Red List of Threatened Species. It is listed on Appendix I of CITES. In Australia, palm cockatoos were relisted from Near Threatened to Vulnerable on 31 October 2015 (EPBC Act List of Threatened Fauna).

Aviculture
This species is in high demand for the pet trade due to its unusual appearance. In early captive situations, pet owners would either feed dog kibble or generic bird seed mixture, while zoos would give them "monkey biscuits". As their nutritional needs became more apparent over the years, owners have shifted to specially formulated "manufactured diet" pellets along with a wide variety of treats like peanuts, pecans, Brazil nuts, pine nuts, sunflower seeds, oranges, apples, grapes, pomegranate, bananas, sweet potatoes, carrots, beets, broccoli, and kale.  Many zoos still give them monkey biscuits to broaden their diet.

References

Further reading

External links

 BirdLife Species Factsheet
 The Palm Cockatoo Research Project.
 Royal Society for the Protection of Birds (RSPB) website – Threats to wild bird populations
 CITES website search page
 Oriental Bird Images: palm cockatoo  Selected photos

palm cockatoo
Birds of the Aru Islands
Birds of New Guinea
Birds of Cape York Peninsula
Talking birds
palm cockatoo
palm cockatoo